Goliath and the Sins of Babylon is a 1963 peplum film directed by Michele Lupo. The film was released in the US by American International Pictures as a double feature with Samson and the Slave Queen.

Plot
Maciste (Goliath in the American release) is in Nefir, a vassal state of the Babylonian empire. He becomes involved in local politics when as part of their tribute to Babylon, Nefir must provide thirty virgin girls each year. When one escapes her captor Maciste vanquishes a large group of soldiers. He comes to the attention of the local resistance who conceal their military training to overthrow the regime by acting as gladiators. Maciste joins the Resistance along with a dwarf giving them a strength of 'forty-two and a half'.  The film features a sea battle and a large scale chariot race.

Cast
 Mark Forest as Goliath / Maciste
 José Greci as Regia /Chelima
 Giuliano Gemma as Xandros
 Erno Crisa as Morakeb
 Mimmo Palmara as Alceas
 Paul Muller as  Rukus, King of Cafaus
 Livio Lorenzon as Evandrus
 Piero Lulli as Pergasus
  Eleonora Bianchi  as The Girl of the Sacrifice
 Jacques Herlin as The Phoenician Merchant
 Alfio Caltabiano as Meneos
 Arnaldo Fabrizio as Goliath the Dwarf

References

External links

1963 films
Peplum films
Films directed by Michele Lupo
Films scored by Francesco De Masi
1960s adventure films
English-language Italian films
Maciste films
Sword and sandal films
American International Pictures films
1960s English-language films
1960s Italian films